A lintel  or lintol is a type of beam (a horizontal structural element) that spans openings such as  portals, doors, windows and fireplaces. It can be a decorative architectural element, or a combined ornamented/structural item. In the case of windows, the bottom span is referred to as a  sill, but, unlike a lintel, does not serve to bear a load to ensure the integrity of the wall.
Modern-day lintels may be made using prestressed concrete and are also referred to as beams in  beam-and-block slabs or as ribs in rib-and-block slabs. These prestressed concrete lintels and blocks can serve as components that are packed together and propped to form a suspended-floor concrete slab.

An arch functions as a curved lintel.

Structural uses
In worldwide architecture of different eras and many cultures, a lintel has been an element of post and lintel construction. Many different building materials have been used for lintels.

In classical Western architecture and construction methods, by Merriam-Webster definition, a lintel is a load-bearing member and is placed over an entranceway. Called an architrave, the lintel is a structural element that is usually rested on stone pillars or stacked stone columns, over a portal or entranceway. An example from the Mycenaean Greece cultural period (c. 1600 – 1100 BCE) is the Treasury of Atreus in Mycenae, Greece. It weighs 120 tons, with approximate dimensions 8.3 × 5.2 × 1.2 m, one of the largest in the world.

A lintel may support the chimney above a fireplace, or span the distance of a path or road, forming a stone lintel bridge.

Ornamental uses

The use of the lintel form as a decorative building element over portals, with no structural function, has been employed in the architectural traditions and styles of most cultures over the centuries.

Examples of the ornamental use of lintels are in the hypostyle halls and slab stelas in ancient Egypt and the Indian rock-cut architecture of Buddhist temples in caves. Preceding prehistoric and subsequent Indian Buddhist temples were wooden buildings with structural load-bearing wood lintels across openings. The rock-cut excavated cave temples were more durable, and the non-load-bearing carved stone lintels allowed creative ornamental uses of classical Buddhist elements. Highly skilled artisans were able to simulate the look of wood, imitating the nuances of a wooden structure and the wood grain in excavating cave temples from monolithic rock.
In freestanding Indian building examples, the Hoysala architecture tradition between the 11th and 14th centuries produced many elaborately carved non-structural stone lintels in the Southern Deccan Plateau region of southern India. The Hoysala Empire era was an important period in the development of art and architecture in the South Indian Kannadiga culture. It is remembered today primarily for its Hindu temples'  mandapa, lintels, and other architectural elements, such as at the Chennakesava Temple.

The Maya civilization in the Americas was known for its sophisticated art and monumental architecture. The Mayan city of Yaxchilan, on the Usumacinta River in present-day southern Mexico, specialized in the stone carving of ornamental lintel elements within structural stone lintels. The earliest carved lintels were created in 723 CE. At the Yaxchilan archaeological site there are fifty-eight lintels with decorative pieces spanning the doorways of major structures. Among the finest Mayan carving to be excavated are three temple door lintels that feature narrative scenes of a queen celebrating the king's anointing by a god.

Radiation protection
Lintels may also be used to reduce scattered radiation in medical applications.  For example, Medical linacs operating at high energies will produce activated neutrons which will be scattered outside the treatment bunker maze with a dose rate that depends on the maze cross section.  Lintels may be visible or recessed in the roof of the facility, and reduce dose rate in publicly accessible areas by reducing the maze cross section.

Types

Decoration
 Atalburu – Basque decorative lintel
 Marriage stone – decorative (can be structural) lintel

Structure
 Architrave – structural lintel or beam resting on columns-pillars
 Dolmen – prehistoric megalithic tombs with structural stone lintels
 Dougong – traditional Chinese structural element
 I-beam – steel lintels and beams
 Post and lintel

Gallery

See also

 Span (architecture)

Notes

Architectural elements
Doors
Ornaments (architecture)